Leelinger Island is a flat dolerite island with an area of 1.54 ha in south-eastern Australia.  It is part of the Hibbs Pyramid Group, lying close to the central western coast of Tasmania.

Fauna
Recorded breeding seabird and wader species are the little penguin (400 pairs), short-tailed shearwater (6000 pairs), Pacific gull and sooty oystercatcher.

References

Islands of Tasmania